The Macau Cycling Association (Association de Ciclismo de Macao) is the governing body of cycle racing in Macau.

It is a member of the UCI and the Asian Cycling Confederation.

External links
Official website

National members of the Asian Cycling Confederation
Cycle racing organizations
Cycle racing in Macau
Sports governing bodies in China